The 2010–11 Isle of Man League was the 102nd season of the Isle of Man Football League on the Isle of Man.

League tables

Premier League

Division 2

Cups

FA Cup

Laxey   5–0    Pulrose United

Railway Cup
Laxey   1–0    St Georges

Charity Shield
Laxey   3–1    St Georges

Hospital Cup
Laxey   1–0    St Georges

Woods Cup
Union Mills   3–1    Colby

Paul Henry Gold Cup
Colby   0–4    Union Mills

Junior Cup
Laxey   6–3    Peel

Cowell Cup (U19)
St Georges   bt    Douglas HS Old Boys

References
FA Full Time – IOM Football League 2010–11

Isle of Man Football League seasons
Man
Foot
Foot